Jin is a proposed group of varieties of Chinese spoken by roughly 63 million people in northern China, including most of Shanxi province, much of central Inner Mongolia, and adjoining areas in Hebei, Henan, and Shaanxi provinces. The status of Jin is disputed among linguists; some prefer to include it within Mandarin, but others set it apart as a closely related, but separate sister-group.

Classification
After the concept Mandarin Chinese was proposed, the Jinnish dialects were universally included within it, mainly because Chinese linguists paid little attention to these dialects at the time. In order to promote Standard Mandarin in the early days of People's Republic of China, linguists started to research various dialects in Shanxi, comparing these dialects with Standard Mandarin for helping the locals to learn it more quickly. During this period, a few linguists discovered some unique features of Jin Chinese that do not exist in other northern Mandarin dialects, planting the seeds for the future independence of Jin Chinese. Finally, in 1985, Li Rong proposed that Jin should be considered a separate top-level dialect group, similar to Yue or Wu. His main criterion was that Jin dialects had preserved the entering tone as a separate category, still marked with a glottal stop as in the Wu dialects, but distinct in this respect from most other Mandarin dialects. Some linguists have adopted this classification. However, others disagree that Jin should be considered a separate dialect group for these reasons:
Use of the entering tone as a diagnostic feature is inconsistent with the way that all other Chinese dialect groups have been delineated based on the reflexes of the Middle Chinese voiced initials.
Certain other Mandarin dialects also preserve the glottal stop, especially the Jianghuai dialects, and so far, no linguist has claimed that these dialects should also be split from Mandarin.

Dialects
The Language Atlas of China, divided Jin into the following eight subgroups:

 , spoken in central Shanxi (the ancient Bing Province), including Taiyuan. Most dialects under this subgroup can distinguish the light entering tone from the dark one, with only 1 level tone. In many dialects, especially those to the south of Taiyuan, the voiced obstruents from Middle Chinese become tenuis in all 4 tones, namely [b] → [p], [d] → [t] and [g] → [k].
 , spoken in western Shanxi (including Lüliang) and northern Shaanxi. Dialects under this subgroup can differentiate light entering tone from dark entering tone. In most dialects, the voiced obstruents from Middle Chinese become aspirated in both level and entering tones, namely [b] → [pʰ], [d] → [tʰ] and [g] → [kʰ].
 , spoken in the area of Changzhi (ancient Shangdang) in southeastern Shanxi. Dialects under this subgroup can differentiate light entering tone from dark entering tone. The palatalization of velar consonants does not occur in some dialects.
 , spoken in parts of northern Shanxi (including Wutai County) and central Inner Mongolia. A few Dialects under this subgroup can differentiate light entering tone from dark entering tone, while the others cannot. The fusion of the level tone and the rising one occurred in some dialects, though some linguistics claim every dialect under this subgroup has this feature.
 , spoken in parts of northern Shanxi and central Inner Mongolia, including Baotou.
 Zhangjiakou–Hohhot subgroup, spoken in Zhangjiakou in northwestern Hebei and parts of central Inner Mongolia, including Hohhot.
 , spoken in southeastern Shanxi, southern Hebei (including Handan) and northern Henan (including Xinxiang).
 Zhi-Yan subgroup, spoken in Zhidan County and Yanchuan County in northern Shaanxi.

The Taiyuan dialect from the Bingzhou subgroup is sometimes taken as a convenient representative of Jin because many studies of this dialect are available, but most linguists agree that the Taiyuan vocabulary is heavily influenced by Mandarin, making it unrepresentative of Jin. The Lüliang subgroup is usually regarded as the "core" of the Jin language group as it preserves most archaic features of Jin. However, there is no consensus as to which dialect among the Lüliang subgroup is the representative dialect.

Phonology
Unlike most varieties of Mandarin, Jin has preserved a final glottal stop, which is the remnant of a final stop consonant (or ). This is in common with the Early Mandarin of the Yuan Dynasty (c. 14th century AD) and with a number of modern southern varieties of Chinese. In Middle Chinese, syllables closed with a stop consonant had no tone. However, Chinese linguists prefer to categorize such syllables as belonging to a separate tone class, traditionally called the "entering tone". Syllables closed with a glottal stop in Jin are still toneless, or alternatively, Jin can be said to still maintain the entering tone. In standard Mandarin Chinese, syllables formerly ending with a glottal stop have been reassigned to one of the other tone classes in a seemingly random fashion.

Initials 

  is mainly used in finals.

 The nasal consonant sounds may vary between nasal sounds  or prenasal stop sounds .
 A prenasal affricated fricative sound , is also present.

Finals 

 The diphthong  may also be realized as a monophthong close central vowel .
  can also be heard as a labio-palatal approximant  when preceding initial consonants.
  when occurring after alveolar sounds  can be heard as an alveolar syllabic , and is heard as a retroflex syllabic  when occurring after retroflex consonants .

Jin employs extremely complex tone sandhi, or tone changes that occur when words are put together into phrases. The tone sandhi of Jin is notable in two ways among Chinese varieties:
 Tone sandhi rules depend on the grammatical structure of the words being put together. Hence, an adjective–noun compound may go through different sets of changes compared to a verb–object compound.
 There are tones that merge when words are pronounced alone, but behave differently (and hence are differentiated) during tone sandhi.

Grammar
For example:
 "fool around" <  "ghost, devil"

In addition, there are a number of words in Jin that evolved, evidently, by splitting a mono-syllabic word into two, adding an 'l' in between (cf. Ubbi Dubbi, but with /l/ instead of /b/). For example:

 <   "hop"
 <   "drag"
 <   "scrape"
 <   "street"

A similar process can in fact be found in most Mandarin dialects (e.g.  kulong <  kong), but it is especially common in Jin.

This may be a kind of reservation for double-initials in Old Chinese, although this is still controversial.

Vocabulary
Lexical diversity in Jin Chinese is obvious, with some words having a very distinct regionality. Usually, there are more unique words in the core dialects than in the non-core dialects and moreover, some cannot be represented in chinese characters.

Some dialects of Jin make a three-way distinction in demonstratives. (Modern English, for example, has only a two-way distinction between "this" and "that", with "yon" being archaic.)

References

Citations

Sources

External links

 Classification of the Jin Dialects
 Details of the Pingyao Dialect

 
Languages of China
Varieties of Chinese